Zhanna Borisovna Nemtsova (born 26 March 1984) is a Russian journalist and social activist. She is the daughter of Boris Nemtsov.

Early life 

Nemtsova was born in Gorky, USSR (now Nizhny Novgorod, Russia) on 26 March 1984, to Russian statesman Boris Nemtsov and part-Tatar investor Raisa Akhmetovna Nemtsova. She graduated from the Moscow State Institute of International Relations. Also in Moscow, she got her second degree in law from the Kutafin Moscow State Law University.

Career 

Nemtsova worked in the radio station Echo of Moscow, and managed her father's website. She later worked as an economic journalist for the Russian TV station RBK, anchoring broadcasts and interviewing representatives from businesses and politicians.

After her father was assassinated in February 2015, Nemtsova called for a proper investigation. She received threats, and, for her safety, emigrated from Russia in June 2015. Following the conviction of five men in connection with her father's assassination, she said: "This was not a full-fledged investigation, but an imitation".

In August 2015, Nemtsova began work as a reporter in the Russian department of the German international broadcaster Deutsche Welle in Bonn.

Nemtsova founded the Boris Nemtsov Foundation "For Freedom" the same year. The Foundation's projects include the annual Boris Nemtsov Award "For Courage in Defending Democratic Values", the Nemtsov Forum and a summer school in journalism.

In 2020, Nemtsova was appointed co-director of the Nemtsov Center, which was created by the Nemtsov Foundation and the Faculty of Philosophy of Charles University in Prague.

In addition to Russian, she is fluent in English and Portuguese.

Boris Nemtsov Plaza

On 6 December 2017, Nemtsova traveled from Germany, accompanied by other family members and Russian dissidents, to urge members of the Washington, D.C. Council, the U.S. capital city's local government, to rename a portion of the street in front of the Russian Embassy “Boris Nemtsov Plaza” in honor of her father and as a signal to Russian authorities of US disapproval of their policies and of their alleged role in Nemtsov's assassination. Legislation to formally make the change was co-sponsored by the Council chairman, Phil Mendelson, who expected the bill to be approved by Council early in 2018. On 9 January 2018, the Council unanimously approved the “Boris Nemtsov Plaza Designation Act of 2017” which authorized the renaming, effective 5 May 2018.

Prizes 
On 4 August 2015, Nemtsova received the $1.1 million Solidarity Prize in Poland for advocating democracy and human rights.

She received an International Women of Courage Award in 2016.

References

External links 

 Farangis Najibullah. 'Russian Propaganda Kills,' Nemtsov's Daughter Says // Radio Free Europe 9 June 2015 (The article contains an abstract of Zhanna Nemtsova's following publication: Жанна Немцова. Государство и общество: пропаганда убивает (State and society: propaganda kills) // "Ведомости" (lit. "The Record"), No. 3848 от 9 June 2015)

1984 births
Living people
Moscow State Institute of International Relations alumni
Russian journalists
Russian people of Tatar descent
Russian people of Jewish descent
German people of Tatar descent
German people of Russian descent
German people of Russian-Jewish descent
Recipients of the International Women of Courage Award